|}

The Vintage Tipple Stakes is a Listed flat horse race in Ireland open to thoroughbred fillies and mares aged four years or older. It is run at Gowran Park over a distance of 1 mile and 6 furlongs (2,816 metres), and it is scheduled to take place each year in May.

The race was introduced as a new Listed race in 2018. It is named after Vintage Tipple, an Irish-trained filly who won the 2003 Irish St. Leger.

Winners

See also 
Horse racing in Ireland
List of Irish flat horse races

References 

Racing Post:

Flat races in Ireland
Gowran Park Racecourse
Long-distance horse races for fillies and mares
Recurring sporting events established in 2018
2018 establishments in Ireland